Lake Taghkanic State Park is a  state park located in the southern part of Columbia County, New York in the United States. The park is on the town line between the towns of Gallatin and Taghkanic, and is adjacent to the Taconic State Parkway.

History
The land for Lake Taghkanic State Park was donated to the state by D. McRae Livingston in 1929, with the requirement that Lake Charlotte's name would be changed to Lake Taghkanic. A Civilian Conservation Corps (CCC) camp was established at the park in 1933, housing laborers tasked with constructing the park's water tower, beach, bathhouse, and cabin area.

Description
Lake Taghkanic State Park has tent and trailer campsites, cabins and cottages, two beaches, picnic areas, boat launch sites, rowboat, paddleboat and kayak rentals, playgrounds, sports fields, a rentable pavilion, a recreation hall, and showers. The park also offers hiking, biking, swimming, fishing, hunting, cross-country ski and snowmobile trails, ice skating, and ice fishing.

See also 
List of New York state parks

References

External links
 New York State Parks: Lake Taghkanic State Park

State parks of New York (state)
Parks in Columbia County, New York